Drumheller-Gleichen was a provincial electoral district in Alberta, Canada, mandated to return a single member to the Legislative Assembly of Alberta using the first-past-the-post method of voting from 1963 to 1971.

History
The electoral district was created in the 1963 boundary redistribution when the Drumheller electoral district was merged with the Gleichen district.

After redistribution in 1970, the district would be formed into Drumheller, and the Gliechen portion would be added to Little Bow.

Members of the Legislative Assembly (MLAs)

Electoral history

1963 general election

1967 general election

See also
List of Alberta provincial electoral districts
Drumheller, Alberta, a town in south-eastern Alberta
Gleichen, Alberta, a hamlet within Wheatland County, Alberta

References

Further reading

External links
Elections Alberta
The Legislative Assembly of Alberta

Former provincial electoral districts of Alberta
Drumheller